Pelenomus is a genus of beetles belonging to the family Curculionidae.

The species of this genus are found in Europe and Northern America.

Species:
 Pelenomus asperulus Dietz, 1896 
 Pelenomus cavifrons Leconte, 1876

References

Curculionidae
Curculionidae genera